SCIFIRE or the Southern Cross Integrated Flight Research Experiment is an American-Australian military technology partnership that is developing a solid-rocket boosted, air-breathing, hypersonic conventional cruise missile that can be launched by existing fighter or bomber aircraft.

History 
The project is led by the United States Department of Defense and the Australian Department of Defence. The United States Air Force, United States Navy, the Royal Australian Air Force Headquarters and the Australian Defence Science and Technology Group are working with contractors Boeing, Lockheed Martin and Raytheon Technologies.

The project is an "outgrowth" of the 2007-initiated HIFiRE project, which involved the same partners and explored scramjet engine technology and tested the flight dynamics of a Mach 8 hypersonic glide vehicle. SCIFiRE officially commenced in November 2020. The missile will be capable of Mach 5 speed and will be suitable for launching from an F/A-18F Super Hornet, EA-18G Growler, F-35A Lightning II or a P-8A Poseidon maritime surveillance aircraft. Flight testing is expected to occur in the RAAF Woomera Range Complex in South Australia.

As of 2021, the missile is expected to enter service within 5 to 10 years. The Australian Government considers the missile to be a potential deterrent to would-be aggressors in the Pacific region.

The follow-on tactical-range Hypersonic Attack Cruise Missile (HACM) will be built by Raytheon Technologies and will use a Northrop Grumman scramjet.

References 

Cruise missiles
Proposed weapons of the United States
Proposed weapons